White Chamber or The White Chamber may refer to:

 White Chamber, an historical hall
 The White Chamber, a 2005 video game
 White Chamber, a 2018 film starring Shauna Macdonald and Oded Fehr